Nathan Evans may refer to:

 Nathan Evans (politician) (1804–1879), American politician
 Nathan George Evans (1824–1868), American soldier
 Nathan Evans (singer), Scottish singer
 Nathan Evans (rugby union) (born 2002), Welsh rugby union player